Death Before Dishonor is the debut album by rapper 2 Pistols, released on June 17, 2008. Guests include T-Pain, Tay Dizm, Ray J, Slick Pulla, Blood Raw, Trey Songz, BMU & Tyra B. A version of "Candy Coated Diamonds" featuring Fergie (instead of Tyra B) leaked on various The Black Eyed Peas fansites.

Critical reception

Death Before Dishonor received mixed reviews from music critics. AllMusic editor David Jeffries was mixed towards the album, praising the J.U.S.T.I.C.E. League's production but felt there were less quality street tracks to give it enough quality, concluding with, "Way too little, way too late to call this a compelling debut, but just like any given Ross album, Death Before Dishonor has singles to spare and enough of that Florida flavor to keep fans happy." DJBooth's Nathan Slavik also gave praise to the production but found 2 Pistols to be an average rapper that delivers sub-standard street tracks, saying that "Death Before Dishonor doesn’t exactly cover a lot of musical ground, it’s essentially 'She Got It' and 'Eyes Closed' remixed and re-titled for an entire album." Pedro Hernandez of RapReviews criticized the album for having nondescript party tracks with faceless production and 2 Pistols for only having the basics of hip-hop content, concluding that "If you absolutely love this type of rap and already ran through the good stuff, 2 Pistols might be something to hold you over. For all others, Death Before Dishonor is about as enjoyable as having '2 Pistols' and no ammo."

Track listing

Personnel 

Vincent Absher – Engineer
Leslie Brathwaite – Mixing
Dane'sha Bullard – Vocals (background)
Bolo "Da" Producer- Producer
Coni Cone – Producer
Ja$mine Conner – Vocals (background)
Ashanti Floyd – Violin
Andre Grell – Marketing Coordinator
Corey Harrison – Vocals (background)
Honorable C.N.O.T.E. – Producer
Justice League (Chuck Greene, Ivan Rivera, Kevin Crowe, Erik Ortiz, Kenneth Bartolomei) – Producer, Engineer, Executive Producer, Mixing
Imran Majid – A&R
Jonathan Mannion – Photography
Nicole Morgan – Creative Coordinator
Gillian Russell – A&R
Glenn Schick – Mastering
Justin Trawick – Assistant
2 Pistols – Executive
Finis "KY" White – Engineer
Young Chu – Vocals (background)
Yung Chill – Producer

Chart positions

Samples
"Flex 2008" is an interpolation of Mad Cobra's "Flex" and contains a direct vocal sample in the chorus. Rihanna also recently sampled the instrumental from "Flex" with the track "Say It" from her 2007 album Good Girl Gone Bad.

References

2008 debut albums
2 Pistols albums
Universal Records albums
Albums produced by Honorable C.N.O.T.E.
Albums produced by J.U.S.T.I.C.E. League